Zulmir Bečević, (born 31 January 1982) is a Swedish-Bosnian author and academic. In 1992 he and his family fled from the civil war in the Republic of Bosnia and Herzegovina to Sweden, an event that laid the foundation for his semi-biographical debut novel Resan som började med ett slut. The novel was published in 2006, and received positive reviews.

His second novel, Svenhammeds journaler, was published in 2009; it was nominated for the August Prize in the Children and Young Adults category.  A stage version of the book was produced at Folkteatern in Gävleborg in 2011.

Bečević's third novel, Avblattefieringsprocessen, is a satire on the growing xenophobia in Swedish society. It was published  in 2014.

When Bečević came to Sweden as a 10-year-old with his family, they moved to Falkenberg where Bečević grew up and went to school. He has a Master's degree in political science from Växjö University, and a PhD in child studies from Linköping University. He is a senior lecturer at the Department of Social Work at Gothenburg University.

References

Living people
1982 births
People from Orašje
Swedish writers